Cupid and Psyche or Amor and Psyche is a sculpture by Bertel Thorvaldsen, begun in 1804 and completed in 1807. It shows Cupid and Psyche. It is now in the Thorvaldsens Museum in Copenhagen.

References

Neoclassical sculptures
1807 sculptures
Sculptures of Cupid
Cupid and Psyche